John Jeremy Cockburn OBE (14 October 1937 - 3 April 2017) was a Scottish test pilot known for his flights in the English Electric Lightning.

Early life
John Cockburn was born on 14 October 1937 at Greenlaw, Berwickshire, the son of a farmer. He was educated at the Loretto School, Musselbrough. He was a keen horseman, his uncle was the trainer Stewart Wright, and he won the Berwickshire point-to-point steeplechase in 1960 and 1964.

Marriage
In 1964 he married Amy Thompson, known as Judy, after they met water-skiing at Hoselaw Loch. They had a son and two daughters.

Career

Death
Cockburn died on 3 April 2017. He was survived by his wife and children. He received obituaries in The Times, The Daily Telegraph, and The Scotsman.

References 

1937 births
2017 deaths
People from Berwickshire
Scottish test pilots
Members of the Order of the British Empire
People educated at Loretto School, Musselburgh
John